Edmundo Rada Angulo, also known as Pipo, (disappeared on 16 October 2019) was a Venezuelan politician who served as councilman for the Popular Will party for Petare, in the Sucre Municipality of Caracas.

Career 
Rada was known as a social leader who spearheaded the organization of community kitchens. He had been a member of Popular Will since the party was founded, according to Leopoldo López.

Disappearance and death 
His body was found on 17 October 2019 on the side of the road out of Petare, burned and with two coup de grâce shots in the back of his neck, after he was reported missing the day before. Disputed interim president and leader of the Popular Will party Juan Guaidó declared that Rada's death was "a murder [committed by] the dictatorship" (i.e. forces loyal to Maduro) and that "there are clear indications that the cause [was] political", suspecting that the crime was committed by the Special Action Forces (FAES). Guaidó noted that Rada was murdered on the same day that Venezuela was elected as member of the United Nations Human Rights Council. Rada's family gave public statements only to Colombian networks, reporting that Rada had fears of the FAES coming after him after they took photographs of him at a protest in late September.

His funeral was held in Unión de Petare, and he is interred at the Caracas East Cemetery. His body was identified and recovered from the Bello Monte morgue by his family and fellow politicians Gilber Caro and Ismael León. On Friday 18 October, the Spanish government condemned the "cruel murder" of a politician.

See also
Fernando Albán
List of solved missing person cases
List of unsolved murders

References

2010s missing person cases
2019 deaths
Afro-Venezuelan
Assassinated Venezuelan politicians
Formerly missing people
Male murder victims
Missing person cases in Venezuela
People murdered in Venezuela
People of the Crisis in Venezuela
Political repression in Venezuela
Popular Will politicians
Venezuelan city councillors
Year of birth missing
Social leaders